Haymer is a surname. Notable people with the surname include:

Herbie Haymer (1916–1949), American jazz saxophonist
Johnny Haymer (1920–1989), American actor

See also
Hamer (surname)
Hammer (surname)